Elections to the French National Assembly were held in Gabon and Moyen Congo as part of the wider French elections election on 10 November 1946.

Electorate and constituencies
The electorate of French colonies in Africa was divided into two segments, one elected by common law citizens (the first college, i.e. French citizens) and one elected by citizens of professional stature (the second college, i.e. Africans who were 21 years and above, and qualified as a member of one of twelve specified categories; civil servants, notables, soldiers and veterans, heads of native collectivities, members of native courts, etc.). In the Gabon-Moyen-Congo constituency for a single first college seat, there were 4,148 registered voters, whilst the two second college seats had 26,530 registered voters in Gabon and 23,119 in Moyen Congo respectively.

In French West Africa the setting up of two separate electoral colleges had caused an uproar, there were generally few reactions from in French Equatorial Africa (AEF). The Congolese member of the National Assembly, Jean-Félix Tchicaya, was the sole voice from the AEF to condemn the separate electoral college system during the debates in the National Assembly in the run-up to the elections.

Electoral participation (amongst the second college) was 47.8% in Gabon and 67.7% in Moyen-Congo.

Results
In the second college, Jean-Félix Tchicaya (the leader of the Congolese Progressive Party) was elected from Moyen-Congo and Jean-Hilaire Aubame was elected from Gabon. Aubame got 7,069 votes, out of 12,528 votes cast. Barthélemy Boganda of the Popular Republican Movement (MRP) was elected from Oubangui-Chari.

Maurice Bayrou was elected from the first college Gabon–Moyen Congo seat. He contested the election as an 'independent socialist', supported by the local French administration. His main rival was the SFIO candidate Henri Seignon. Bayrou got 55.1% (around 1195 votes) of the votes and Seignon 39% (846 votes). After the elections, Bayrou joined the Gaullist Rally of the French People.

First College

Second College: Gabon

Second College: Moyen Congo

References

Gabon
1946
1946 11
1946 11
Gabon
1946 in Moyen-Congo
1946 in Gabon